The following is the list of the Mayors of the Royal City of Kraków, Poland; heads of local municipal government according to extant records. Most have been elected by inhabitants, with notable exceptions, such as mayors mandated by foreign authorities during various types of militarised control of the city such as Partitions or the Nazi German occupation of Poland.

List of mayors

See also
 Timeline of Kraków

Notes and references

  Prezydenci miasta Krakowa, bądź osoby pełniące tę funkcję (mirror). Szkolnictwo.pl, 2008

Bibliography
Professor Jan Marian Małecki (b. 1926),  Dzieje Krakowa (originally in several volumes). Wyd. Kraków, 1984.

 
Kraków